The following is a list of Turkish players in the National Basketball Association (NBA). This list also includes players who were born outside of Turkey but have represented the national team. Mirsad Türkcan is the first Turkish basketball player to play in the NBA.

Key

Players

Drafted but never played

NBA champions

Former NBA All-Star Game participants

See also
List of foreign NBA players

Notes
 Each year is linked to an article about that particular NBA season.
  dissolved in 1992 into five independent countries, Bosnia and Herzegovina, Croatia, Macedonia, Slovenia, and the Federal Republic of Yugoslavia. FR Yugoslavia was renamed into Serbia and Montenegro in February 2003 and dissolved into two independent countries, Montenegro and Serbia, in June 2006.

References

 
Turkish Nba
NBA